Cloverdale, Fluvanna County is an unincorporated community in Fluvanna County, in the U.S. state of Virginia.  Cloverdale has historically been an African American community.

References

Unincorporated communities in Virginia
Unincorporated communities in Fluvanna County, Virginia